The Backyard Brawl is an American college football rivalry between the University of Pittsburgh Panthers and the West Virginia University Mountaineers. The term "Backyard Brawl" has also been used to refer to college basketball games played annually or semi-annually and may also be used to refer to other athletic competitions between the two schools. It is a registered trademark for both universities, and refers to the close proximity of the two universities, separated by 75 miles (105 km) along Interstate 79.

The football rivalry is the 14th oldest in the United States and is typically shown on national television. In the past, the Backyard Brawl has been seen on ABC, CBS, ESPN, and ESPN2. Through the 105 games played between these two schools, Pitt leads the series 62–40–3.

History

The football series was first played in 1895, and the game has historically been one of the more intense rivalries in the eastern United States. The rivalry between the two schools is due mainly to proximity. WVU's campus in Morgantown, West Virginia is only about 70 miles south of Pittsburgh (via Interstate 79), and the two schools often compete for the same recruits.

The 1921 edition of the Backyard Brawl was the first college football game broadcast on the radio when Harold W. Arlin announced the 21–13 Pittsburgh victory on KDKA.

From 1962–2011, the series alternated between Pittsburgh and Morgantown on a yearly basis. Before that, the games were held in Pittsburgh on an almost regular basis, with Morgantown occasionally hosting the game. At one point, Pittsburgh hosted the game 11 years in a row (1919–29) and also hosted eight straight contests between 1938–48. (There were no matchups from 1940–42.) In contrast, the most consecutive games West Virginia has hosted were four in a row from 1895–1901, with one of those games held in Fairmont, West Virginia, now the home to Fairmont State University, and one in Wheeling, West Virginia. The most consecutive games played in Morgantown, three, were held from 1932–34.

West Virginia started out the series leading, 5–1. Pittsburgh won four games in a row from 1904–08 (there was no game played in 1905) to tie the series at 5–5. In 1909, the teams played to a 0–0 tie, making the series 5–5–1. The following year, Pittsburgh won 38–0, taking a 6–5–1 lead in the series, and has led ever since. Since the series began interchanging annually between Morgantown and Pittsburgh in 1963, the Mountaineers have held a 25–22–2 advantage over the Panthers.

On November 25, 2004, the Backyard Brawl series saw its 97th game, surpassing the 96–game Penn State–Pittsburgh football rivalry as Pittsburgh's most–played rivalry game. Pittsburgh celebrated the event with a 16–13 win at Heinz Field.

On December 1, 2007, the 100th Backyard Brawl took place. Pittsburgh upset WVU by a score of 13–9. Coming into the game, WVU was ranked first in the Coaches' Poll and second in both the BCS and AP Poll. With the loss, WVU's BCS National Championship Game chances were lowered.

The Mountaineers and the Panthers wore Nike Pro Combat System of Dress, uniforms designed to pay respect to Pittsburgh's steel industry and West Virginia's coal mining industry, for the 2010 Backyard Brawl. According to the Pittsburgh Tribune Review, West Virginia wore a shade of white "that looks as if it has a fine layer of dust on the jersey" and has accents in university gold that "references the canaries used long ago to test toxicity in mines." The helmet has a thin yellow line, designed to look like "the beam of light emitted by a miner's headlamp." Meanwhile, Pitt wore smoky college navy and black jerseys and pants with metallic team gold numerals "to represent the brilliant glow of a blast furnace," according to a Nike website, and matching helmets with a gold stripe and logo "evocative of steel I-beams" and resembling a hard hat. West Virginia won the game in Pittsburgh 35–10.

On September 18, 2011, Pittsburgh announced its departure from the Big East and was introduced as a member of the Atlantic Coast Conference (ACC). A month later, on October 28, West Virginia accepted an invitation to join the Big 12. With both universities now in different conferences, the Backyard Brawl was put on hiatus. The 2012 college football season marked the first time since 1943 that the rivalry was not played in football, breaking a streak of 68 consecutive meetings.

In September 2015, both universities agreed to a four-game series running from 2022–25. In April 2022, both universities announced the addition of four more games from 2029–2032.

Football

Location

The location of the Backyard Brawl has varied much throughout its history. The very first football game took place in Wheeling, West Virginia in 1895. The next meeting, in 1898, was held in Fairmont, a short distance south of Morgantown. The third and fourth contests were held in Morgantown. The year 1902 marked the first time the game was held in Pittsburgh, at Exposition Park, the North Shore home of the Pittsburgh Pirates. 1910 was the first time the Backyard Brawl was held on the Pittsburgh campus, at brand-new Forbes Field. The series was held here for eight of the next nine years, until the opening of Pitt Stadium in 1925 on the opposite end of the University of Pittsburgh campus. Pitt Stadium hosted 5 straight games, until in 1930, the Backyard Brawl found itself at yet another new location, Mountaineer Field, which had opened in 1924 on the campus of West Virginia University.  Another change in location occurred in 1981, when the game was played at a new Mountaineer Field in Morgantown. In 1998 and 2000, the game was played at Three Rivers Stadium. The most recent change took place in 2002, when the Backyard Brawl was played for the first time at Heinz Field (now called Acrisure Stadium), the new, full-time home of the Panthers, a year after it was opened.

Notable games
1895:  In the schools' first meeting, West Virginia beat then-Western University of Pennsylvania, 8-0. Western had yet to become the University of Pittsburgh. Of West Virginia's four "home" games that season, it was the only one played in Morgantown. The others were played in Parkersburg, Wheeling and Charleston.
1921:  The 1921 edition of the Backyard Brawl was the first college football game broadcast on the radio when Harold W. Arlin announced the 21–13 Pittsburgh victory on KDKA.
1952: West Virginia recorded its first-ever victory over a ranked team when the unranked Mountaineers knocked of 18th-rated Pitt in Pittsburgh.
1955: West Virginia was an undefeated 7-0 going into the game, but Pitt never trailed after an early touchdown catch by Joe Walton, who later coached the New York Jets. Pitt’s win is credited with knocking WVU out of contention for the Sugar Bowl.
1961:  West Virginia’s victory at Pitt in 1961 became known as the “Garbage Game” because one of the Panther players referred to West Virginia, which was winless in 1960, as rebuilding its program with “Western Pennsylvania garbage.”
1965: At the time, the 1965 contest was one of the highest-scoring major college games ever played. Teletype operators across the country kept messaging the Mountaineer Field press box, wondering if the score was real, as West Virginia beat Pitt 63-48. The loss began a stretch of six losses in seven games for Pitt that included a 69-13 loss to Notre Dame.
1970: West Virginia led 35-8 at halftime, but Pitt switched to a Power-I offense and rallied with four touchdowns in the second half to upset the Mountaineers. Afterward, West Virginia fans beat on the dressing room door, screaming in anger at then-rookie head coach Bobby Bowden. Bowden, who went on to set coaching records and win multiple national titles at Florida State, later referred to the game as his “darkest day in coaching.”
1975: Walk-on kicker Bill McKenzie's game-winning field goal in the closing seconds led to one of the longest postgame celebrations ever at old Mountaineer Field as West Virginia beat Pitt 17-14. Led by Heisman Trophy winner Tony Dorsett, Pitt would rebound to win the 1976 national championship and 67 of its next 77 regular-season games.
1982: Pitt spent much of the season at No. 1 while starting 7-0, but held on to beat West Virginia 16-13 only when kicker Paul Woodside's long field goal attempt hit the crossbar.
1983: Jeff Hostetler drove the Mountaineers 90 yards in the final two minutes for West Virginia to overcome Pitt, 24-21. It was WVU’s first victory over Pitt since 1975, and future College Football Hall of Fame coach Don Nehlen's first in four tries as the Mountaineers head coach.
1997: In Pitt coach Walt Harris' first season, Pitt beat WVU 41-38 in 3OT. This win propelled the Panthers into their first bowl game in eight years and began the school's turnaround following six losing seasons in seven years. West Virginia's Marc Bulger passed for 348 yards in the losing effort.
2002: West Virginia Quarterback Rasheed Marshall, a Brashear High School graduate, gets his first win against former City League rival Rod Rutherford, who played quarterback at Perry Traditional Academy. A sellout crowd of 66,731 was the largest ever for a game at Heinz Field at the time.
2007: On Saturday, December 1, 2007, the 100th edition of the Backyard Brawl took place at Mountaineer Field in Morgantown, West Virginia. The 4–7 Panthers upset the 2nd–ranked Mountaineers 13–9, knocking West Virginia out of the BCS National Championship Game. The game was one of the most important Backyard Brawls, one of the biggest upsets for the Pittsburgh Panthers, one of the biggest upsets of the season, and was voted as the "Game of the Year" by ESPNU. The contest was also the final game for Mountaineers coach Rich Rodriguez, who infamously left WVU to become the head coach at Michigan after the game.
2009: Despite suffering back-to-back losses in 2007 and 2008, WVU got revenge when the series returned to Morgantown in 2009. The unranked Mountaineers upset the No. 8 Panthers 19–16 on a game-ending field goal. The 2009 Backyard Brawl was one of the most watched games in the history of ESPN2. Although Pitt lost to WVU and No. 5 Cincinnati the following week, Pitt finished the season with ten wins for the first time since 1981.
2011: As the final Backyard Brawl with both schools as a member of the Big East Conference, West Virginia overcame a ten point deficit to beat Pitt, 21-20. Late in the regular season, the win was critical for the Mountaineers' then "slim hopes" to win a share of the conference title and "for earning the league's automatic BCS berth." West Virginia went on to beat South Florida the next week, win a share of the conference title, and secure a BCS bid to the program's first ever Orange Bowl appearance, where they beat Clemson.
2022: The first meeting between the two teams since 2011 took place during Week 1 of the 2022 season. The game set a Pittsburgh city record for attendance at a sporting event at 70,622. The game was back and forth, featuring 7 lead changes with Pitt overcoming a 4th quarter deficit and taking the lead on a 56 yard M.J. Devonshire Pick Six with 2:58 remaining in the game. Pitt would then  stop a promising West Virginia drive to win the game 38-31.

Game results

See also
 List of NCAA college football rivalry games
 List of most-played college football series in NCAA Division I

Basketball
The Backyard Brawl moniker is also used for the basketball rivalry between the two schools, which dates to February 17, 1905. The teams began competing annually since 1918, and played each season continually until 2012. Through the first 100 meetings, the teams were evenly matched both winning 50 games.

Pitt began playing basketball in the Big East Conference in 1982–83, with the Mountaineers joining in 1995–96. The basketball rivalry has heated up over the last several years as each team has been among the best in the country and the games have taken on added significance. On February 9, 2006, for the first time in the history of the series, in the 169th edition, Pitt and WVU were both nationally ranked as they squared off in Pitt's Petersen Events Center. Pitt won, but a few weeks later, the two ranked teams played at WVU Coliseum with the Mountaineers winning. In the 2008–09 season, the Panthers swept both games during the regular season and came into the tournament ranked No. 2, but were upset by the Mountaineers in the quarterfinals of the Big East tournament.

During a February 2010 game when Pittsburgh visited West Virginia, several times during the course of the game, West Virginia fans threw objects at the Pittsburgh team. A Pittsburgh assistant coach was injured when an object was thrown at him. The actions received widespread attention. During the second half of the game, coach Bob Huggins used a microphone to address the fans. West Virginia University President Jim Clements issued an apology to the University of Pittsburgh community. Additionally, West Virginia vowed to address security, as the incident closing followed similar occurrences in games against Syracuse and Ohio State. This game was followed with a rematch nine days later in Pittsburgh, and while there were no off-court incidents, the game proved to be one of the most memorable in the history of the series as the 25th ranked Panthers upset the fourth ranked Mountaineers 98–95 in the first triple overtime basketball game to be played between the two schools.

The 2011–12 season marked the end of the Brawl within Big East conference play.  Pitt and WVU traded road wins, with Pitt winning in Morgantown 72–66, and WVU winning at the Petersen Events Center for only the second time ever 66–48.  The rivalry was dormant for a few years as WVU began playing in the Big 12 in 2012, while Pitt moved to the ACC in 2013. However, the series renewed in non-conference play beginning in 2017, with WVU winning the last four recent matchups. In 2021, West Virginia sold out the WVU Coliseum for the first time ever in the month of November when it hosted the matchup, on its way to reaching 100 wins in the series.

In women's basketball, West Virginia leads the modern series, begun in 1975, 25–18.

Soccer

Men's soccer

See also 

 Backyard Brawl game day
 List of NCAA college football rivalry games
 List of most-played college football series in NCAA Division I

References

External links
 Tales From The Backyard Brawl
 Brawl Ball (basketball)
 Pittsburgh vs. West Virginia series history

Backyard Brawl
College basketball rivalries in the United States
College soccer rivalries in the United States
1895 establishments in West Virginia
Recurring sporting events established in 1895
Pittsburgh Panthers football
West Virginia Mountaineers football
Pittsburgh Panthers men's basketball
West Virginia Mountaineers men's basketball
Pittsburgh Panthers men's soccer
West Virginia Mountaineers men's soccer